Connie Bruck is an American journalist and a reporter on subjects covering business and politics. She has been a staff writer at The New Yorker since 1989. Before joining The New Yorker, she was a staff writer at The American Lawyer for nine years. Her stories have also appeared in The Washington Post, The New York Times, and The Atlantic Monthly.

Bruck is married to Mel Levine, a lawyer and former American politician.

Awards and recognition
 Her article on Ivan Boesky in The Atlantic won the 1984 John Hancock Award for excellence in business and financial reporting.
 Her profile of Newt Gingrich in The New Yorker titled "The Politics of Perception" won the 1996 National Magazine Award for Reporting.
 Bruck's article "Deal of the Year" in The New Yorker won the 1991 National Magazine Award for Reporting and the Gerald Loeb Award for Magazines.
 Bruck won a second Gerald Loeb Award for Magazines in 2013 for "Cashier du Cinema" in The New Yorker.

Bibliography

Books
 
 Master of the Game: Steve Ross and the Creation of Time Warner, Simon & Schuster, New York, 1994, 
 When Hollywood Had a King: The reign of Lew Wasserman, who leveraged talent into power and influence, Random House, New Hork, 2003,

Essays and reporting

References

External links
 
 Booknotes interview with Bruck on When Hollywood Had a King: The Reign of Lew Wasserman, Who Leveraged Talent into Power and Influence, July 20, 2003.

Living people
American business and financial journalists
American political journalists
The New Yorker staff writers
Gerald Loeb Award winners for Magazines
Year of birth missing (living people)